"Second Guessing" is a song recorded by American country music duo Florida Georgia Line. The song originated from the duo's appearance on American television series Songland, where singer-songwriter Griffen Palmer pitched the original song to them. It appeared on the duo's 2020 extended play 6-Pack and their susbsequent fifth studio album Life Rolls On.

Background
Griffen Palmer, one of the song's original writers, performed the original version of the song on NBC's television show Songland on May 18, 2020, in front of Tyler Hubbard and Brian Kelley of Florida Georgia Line as well as the show's cast of songwriters: Ryan Tedder, Shane McAnally, and Ester Dean. After re-working  the song with McAnally, Palmer and "Second Guessing" were selected as the winner of that episode by Florida Georgia Line, who chose to record it over competing songs by Shawn Austin, Lukr, and Victoria Banks.

Commercial performance
"Second Guessing" peaked at number 24 on the Billboard Bubbling Under Hot 100 chart for the week of May 30, 2020, directly following its release. It peaked at number 29 on the Hot Country Songs chart for the same week. It spent two weeks on both charts. In Canada, the song entered and peaked at number 99 on the all-genre Canadian Hot 100 for the same week.

Music video
The official music video for "Second Guessing" premiered on YouTube on May 18, 2020.

Credits and personnel
Adapted from AllMusic.

 Adam Ayan – mastering engineer
 David Cook – mixing assistant
 Corey Crowder – composition, editing, production, programming, recording
 Ester Dean – composition
 Andrew DeRoberts – composition, electric guitar, programming
 Tyler Hubbard – composition, production
 Jeff Juliano – mixing
 Brian Kelley – composition, production
 Alyson McAnally – production coordination
 Shane McAnally – composition
 Griffen Palmer – composition
 Doug Rich – production coordination
 Ben Simonetti – composition
 Janice Soled – production coordination
 Ryan Tedder – composition
 Geoff Warburton – composition
 Derek Wells – dobro, electric guitar
 Alex Wright – Hammond B-3 organ, piano, synthesizer

Charts

Griffen Palmer version

Canadian country singer-songwriter Griffen Palmer released his own version of the song after signing with Big Loud Records. It is his debut single, and the lead single off his upcoming debut album, set for release later in 2023.

Background
Palmer remarked that the song is "such an important part of my story as an artist," and that he was "excited to put my own spin on it and put it out." He added that after his appearance on Songland, people often asked him if he would release his own version of the song, and he was thus happy to release it for them.

Critical reception
Erica Zisman of Country Swag reviewed Palmer's release of the song favourably, stating that it is a "confident portrayal of what it feels like to be with the right person," and that "Palmer's knack for songwriting is obvious," while "he has the vocals to back it up." Maxim Mower of Holler also gave the song a positive review, writing that Palmer's version "feels noticeably smoother and slicker than Florida Georgia Line's rendition."

Live performance
Palmer performed the song live on season 27 of ABC's reality television show The Bachelor on February 6, 2023, with his performance being part of a special "one-on-one date" between members of the cast.

Music video
The official video for Palmer's version of "Second Guessing" was released concurrently with the song on YouTube on January 13, 2020.

Charts

References

2020 songs
2023 songs
2023 singles
Big Loud singles
Canadian country music songs
Florida Georgia Line songs
Songs written by Griffen Palmer
Songs written by Tyler Hubbard
Songs written by Brian Kelley (musician)
Songs written by Geoff Warburton
Songs written by Corey Crowder (songwriter)
Songs written by Shane McAnally
Songs written by Ryan Tedder
Song recordings produced by Joey Moi